Divine was the first major release from Blinded Colony. It would be the first and last album to feature singer Niklas Svensson. This would also be the only album they released under the Scarlet Records Banner. It would be released thoroughly in Europe via Scarlet Records, and in Japan through Soundholic Records.

Track listing
"Contagious Sin" – 4:05
"Thorned and Weak" – 3:23
"Legacy (Slaves in the Name of Christ)" – 4:20
"Self-Obtained Paranoia" – 3:53
"Lifeless Dominion" – 4:04
"Discrown the Holy" – 3:50
"Kingdom of Pain" – 3:30
"Demoniser DCLXVI" – 4:54
"Anno Domini 1224" – 4:32

Credits
Niklas Svensson – vocals
Tobias Olsson – guitars
Johan Blomstrom – guitars
Roy Erlandsson – bass
Staffan Franzen – drums

Others:
Ricky Andreoni – graphic design
Carlos del Olmo – logo, cover art
Göran Finnberg – mastering

2003 debut albums
The Blinded albums
Scarlet Records albums